Pakistan competed at the 1952 Summer Olympics in Helsinki, Finland. 38 competitors, all men, took part in 25 events in 7 sports.

Results by event

Athletics

Men's 100 metres

 Mohammad Sharif Butt
 Heat 7 1st round; 11.0 (→ did not advance)

 Jemadar Mohammad Aslam
 Heat 9 1st round; 10.9 (→ advanced to second round)
 Heat 1 2nd round; 10.9 (→ did not advance)

 Abdul Aziz
 Heat 11 1st round; 11.2 (→ did not advance)

Men's 200 metres

 Abdul Aziz
 Heat 8 1st round; 22.7 (→ did not advance)

 Jemadar Mohammad Aslam
 Heat 9 1st round; 22.2 (→ did not advance)

 Mohammad Sharif Butt
 Heat 11 1st round; 22.3 (→ did not advance)

Men's 400 metres

 Abdul Rehman
 Heat 1 1st round; 51.2 (→ did not advance)

 Aurang Zeb
 Heat 3 1st round; 51.0 (→ did not advance)

Men's 800 metres

 Alam Zeb
 Heat 3 1st round; 1:56.3 (→ did not advance)

Men's 10,000 metres

 Abdul Rashid
 33.50.4 finished 30th out of 33

Men's marathon

 Havildar Mohammad Aslam
 2.43:38.2 finished 38th out of 53

 Mohammad Benaras
 Interrupted, did not finish

Men's 400 metres hurdles

 Mohammad Shafi
 Heat 2 1st round; 56.1 (→ did not advance)

 Mirza Khan
 Heat 5 1st round; 56.3 (→ did not advance)

Men's 4x100 metres relay

 Mohammad Sharif Butt, Mohammad Fazil, Abdul Aziz and Jemadar Mohammad Aslam
 Heat 4 1st round; 42.8 (→ advanced to semifinals)
 Semifinals heat 1; 42.0 (→ did not advance)

Men's 4x400 metres relay

 Abdul Rehman, Mohammad Shafi, Mirza Khan and Aurang Zeb
 Heat 2 1st round; 3:23.2 (→ did not advance)

Men's throwing the javelin

 Jalal Khan
 Qualifying trials heat 1; 55.56m finished 12th out of 13

Men's throwing the hammer

 Fazal Hussain
 Qualifying trials heat 1; 48.36m finished 15th out of 16

 Mohammad Iqbal
 Qualifying trials heat 2; 47.45m finished 15th out of 16

Men's 10,000 metres walk

 Allah Ditta
 Heat 1 1st round; disqualified

Boxing

Men's featherweight (57 kg)

 Sydney Greve
 1st round; Beat A Leyes (ARG) KO 2nd rd
 2nd round; Lost to J Ventaja (FRA) on pts 3:0

Men's lightweight (60 kg)

 Mohammad Ali
 1st round; Bye
 2nd round; Lost to V Marute (VEN) KO 1st rd

Men's welterweight (67 kg)

 Anwar Pasha Turki
 1st round; Lost to H van der Linde (RSA) TKO 1st rd

Men's middleweight (75 kg)

 Khan Mohammad
 1st round; Beat H Nowara (POL) on pts 2:1
 2nd round; Lost to W Sentimenti (ITA) on pts 3:0

Cycling

Men's 1,000 metres sprint scratch race

 Mohammad Naqi Malik
 Heat 5 1st round (→ entered repechage phase)
 Repechage heat 3 (→ did not qualify for quarter-finals) Placed 19th overall

Men's 1,000 metres time trial

 Imtiaz Bhatti
 1:21.2 finished 25th out of 27

Men's team competition individual road race (190.4 km)

 Mohammad Naqi Malik and Imtiaz Bhatti
 Both broke off and did not finish

Hockey

Men's Team Competition

 First round; Bye
 Second round; Defeated  (6-0)

Semifinals

Third Place Match

Pakistan finished 4th

Team Roster

 Mohammad Niaz Khan (captain)
 Abdul Aziz Malik (vice-captain)
 Fazalur Rehman (gk)
 Qazi Abdul Waheed (gk)
 Manzoor Hussain Atif
 Asghar Ali Khan
 Mohammad Rafiq
 Khawaja Mohammad Aslam
 Habib Ali Kiddie
 Jack Britto
 Safdar Ali Babul
 Abdul Latif Mir
 Mahmoodul Hasan Sheikh
 Syed Azmat Ali
 Abdul Hameed
 Abdul Qayyum Khan
 Habibur Rehman
 Latifur Rehman

Latifur Rehman had represented the gold medal winning India men's hockey team at the 1948 Olympic Games in London, before migrating to Pakistan

Shooting

One shooter represented Pakistan in 1952.

50 m rifle, prone

 Jan Azam
 Score 90/86/94/96=366 finished 8th out of 58

Swimming

Men's 400 metres freestyle

 Mohammad Ramzan
 Heat 8 1st round; 5:45.7 (→ did not advance)

Men's 1,500 metres freestyle

 Mohammad Ramzan
 Heat 2 1st round; 23:44.3 (→ did not advance)

Men's 200 metres breaststroke

 Muhammad Bashir
 Heat 2 1st round; 3:01.3 (→ did not advance)

Weightlifting

Men's middleweight (75 kg)

 Mohammad Iqbal Butt
 Press 95kg
 Snatch 100kg
 Jerk 130kg
 Total 325kg finished 17th out of 20

References

Nations at the 1952 Summer Olympics
1952 Summer Olympics
1952 in Pakistani sport